Madison Clinton Peters (November 6, 1859 – October 12, 1918) was an American clergyman.

Formative years
Born in Lehigh County, Pennsylvania in 1859, Peters was educated at Franklin and Marshall College, and at Heidelberg Theological Seminary, Tiffin, Ohio.

In 1880, he entered the ministry of the reformed church, remaining under that church's leadership until 1907 when he gave up a denominational connection to become a "free" preacher. Peters served as pastor of: First Presbyterian Church, Philadelphia; Bloomingdale Reformed, New York; Sumner Avenue Baptist, Brooklyn; Immanuel Baptist, Baltimore; and Epiphany (Episcopal), New York.

Death and interment
Peters died on October 12, 1918 in Manhattan, and was interred at the Kensico Cemetery in Valhalla, New York.

Bibliography
 Justice to the Jew (1899; new edition, revised, 1910)
 Wit and wisdom of the Talmud (1900)
 The Birds of the Bible (1901)
 Will the Coming Man Marry? (1905)
 Abraham Lincoln's Religion (1909)
 Haym Salomon (1911)
 The Mission of Masonry (1913)
 The Genius of the Jew (1914)
 How to be Happy Though Married (1915)
 The Seven Secrets of Success (1916)

References

External links
 
 
 "Rev. Madison Peters" (memorial). Salt Lake City, Utah: Find A Grave, retrieved online July 9, 2019.

1859 births
1918 deaths
American Christian clergy
American religious writers
People from Lehigh County, Pennsylvania
Reformed Church in America ministers
Religious leaders from Pennsylvania
Burials at Kensico Cemetery